Orazio Rapari or Horatius Raparius (1544–1595) was a Roman Catholic prelate who served as Bishop of Alessano (1594–1595).

Biography
On 3 October 1594, Orazio Rapari was appointed during the papacy of Pope Clement VIII as Bishop of Alessano. He served as Bishop of Alessano until his death in 1595.

References

External links and additional sources
 (for Chronology of Bishops) 
 (for Chronology of Bishops) 

16th-century Italian Roman Catholic bishops
1595 deaths
Bishops appointed by Pope Clement VIII
1544 births